Chiasmocleis lacrimae, the central humming frog, is a frog in the family Microhylidae.  It is endemic to Brazil, where it lives in lowland forest habitats.

References

Frogs of South America
Amphibians described in 2014
lacrimae